Bill Mason (ca. 1897-29 July 1949) was a radio journalist for KBKI in Alice, Texas. He was shot dead by the town's deputy sheriff Sam Smithwick in 1949.

Murder

Bill Mason, a radio journalist for KBKI in Alice, Texas, said on air before he was killed that he had been threatened. He responded on that program by being more vocal in his criticism of the dance hall and prostitution than previously. Mason was getting out of his car on an Alice, Texas street when he was shot. The bullet hit Mason near his heart.

Reactions
The murder of Mason upset the community, and an attorney argued that Smithwick should not seek bail for his safety. The newspapers reported that Smithwick might be moved as tensions were raised the day after the murder by a shooting at a dance hall.

Victim

Bill Mason started his journalism career as a newspaper reporter. He reported in Minnesota and then went on to be a journalist for the New York Times and the San Francisco Examiner. He also worked at two Texas newspapers, the San Antonio Light and the Alice Echo, before taking a post at KBKI Radio.
 
In the closing arguments phase of his murder trial, the prosecutor attorney, James K. Evetts, said, "He had the nerve to tell the truth for a lot of little people." Mason's tombstone reads the quote given by the prosecutor.

Perpetrator

Mason was shot and killed by Sam Smithwick, a Texas deputy sheriff. Smithwick was found guilty of murder with malice and sentenced to life in prison. The story was that Smithwick committed suicide in his cell, but it is probable that he was murdered to keep him from speaking with Former Texas governor Coke Stevenson, who had arranged to meet the prisoner on the day that the "suicide" took place.  Smithwick, an associate of Duval County boss George Parr, had been the deputy who produced the famous "ballot box 13" that swayed the 1948 Texas Democratic Senatorial primary to Lyndon Johnson.  Stevenson was travelling to meet Smithwick in an attempt to get to the truth of the matter.  Johnson had trailed after the votes were tabulated by about 200 votes statewide, and the "found" ballot box contained enough votes to turn the election around.  The new "votes", all for Johnson, had been "cast" in alphabetical order, with each signed by the same pen in the same handwriting.  For sources, see Robert Caro's THE YEARS OF LYNDON JOHNSON.

Impact
After Smithwick's death, rumors surfaced that the "suicide" was murder, but Johnson waved aside the story and denied any knowledge of the events.  The CBS television show did an episode on the events, including the killing of Bill Mason, entitled THE DUKE OF DUVAL after Parr died in 1975.  In 1964, the Goldwater campaign printed copies of a book A TEXAN LOOKS AT LYNDON by J. Evetts Haly, which detailed the events of the Mason murder and Parr's connections to LBJ.

See also
 List of journalists killed in the United States

References

External links 
 Newseum.org

1949 murders in the United States
American radio journalists
Assassinated American journalists
Deaths by firearm in Texas
People murdered in Texas
July 1949 events in the United States